Epcot, stylized in all uppercase as EPCOT, is a theme park at the Walt Disney World Resort in Bay Lake, Florida. It is owned and operated by The Walt Disney Company through its Parks, Experiences and Products division. Inspired by an unrealized concept of the same name developed by Walt Disney, the park opened on October 1, 1982, as EPCOT Center, and was the second of four theme parks built at Walt Disney World, after Magic Kingdom Park. Spanning , more than twice the size of Magic Kingdom Park, Epcot is dedicated to the celebration of human achievement, namely technological innovation and international culture, and is often referred to as a "permanent world's fair".

Epcot was originally conceived by Walt Disney during the early development of Walt Disney World, as an experimental planned community that would serve as a center for American enterprise and urban living. Known as "EPCOT", an acronym for Experimental Prototype Community of Tomorrow, the idea included an urban city center, residential areas, industrial areas, schools, and a series of mass transportation systems that would connect the community. After Disney's death in 1966, the "EPCOT" concept was abandoned as the company was uncertain about the feasibility of operating a city. In the 1970s, WED Enterprises began developing a second theme park for the resort to supplement Magic Kingdom, as that park's popularity grew. The new park reprised the idea of showcasing modern innovation through avant-garde edutainment attractions, as well as the addition of a world nations exposition. The newly designed park, featuring two sections—Future World and World Showcase—opened as EPCOT Center in 1982. In 1994, the park was renamed to "Epcot", dropping the acronym and "Center" from the name. In the late 2010s, the park began a major ongoing multi-year overhaul including several new and replaced attractions as well as the revision of the existing two sections of the park into four: World Celebration, World Discovery, World Nature and World Showcase.

In 2019, Epcot hosted 12.444 million guests, ranking it as the fourth-most-visited theme park in North America and the seventh-most-visited theme park in the world. The park is represented by Spaceship Earth, a geodesic sphere.

History

1960s: Experimental concept

The genesis for Epcot was originally conceived as a utopian city of the future by Walt Disney in the 1960s. The concept was an acronym for Experimental Prototype Community of Tomorrow, often interchanging "city" and "community." In Walt Disney's words in 1966: "EPCOT will take its cue from the new ideas and new technologies that are now emerging from the creative centers of American industry. It will be a community of tomorrow that will never be completed but will always be introducing and testing, and demonstrating new materials and new systems. And EPCOT will always be a showcase to the world of the ingenuity and imagination of American free enterprise."

Walt Disney's original vision was for a model community that would have been home to twenty thousand residents and a test bed for city planning as well as organization. It was to have been built in the shape of a circle with businesses and commercial areas at its center with community buildings, schools, and recreational complexes around it while residential neighborhoods would line the perimeter. This radial plan concept is strongly influenced by British planner Ebenezer Howard and his Garden Cities of To-morrow. Transportation would have been provided by monorails and PeopleMovers (like those in Tomorrowland). Automobile traffic would be kept underground, leaving pedestrians safe above ground. Walt Disney was not able to obtain funding and permission to start work on his Florida property until he agreed to first build Magic Kingdom. He died nearly five years before Magic Kingdom opened.

1970s: Concept evolves into park
After Walt Disney's death, Walt Disney Productions decided that it did not want to be in the business of running a city without Walt's guidance. The model community of Celebration, Florida has been mentioned as a realization of Disney's original vision, but Celebration is based on concepts of new urbanism which is radically different from Disney's modernist and futurist visions. However, the idea of EPCOT was instrumental in prompting the state of Florida to create the Reedy Creek Improvement District (RCID) and the cities of Bay Lake and Reedy Creek (now Lake Buena Vista), a legislative mechanism, enshrined in laws like the Reedy Creek Improvement Act, allowing Disney to exercise governmental powers over Walt Disney World. Control over the RCID is vested in the landowners of the district, and the promise of an actual city in the district would have meant that the powers of the RCID would have been distributed among the landowners in EPCOT. Because the idea of EPCOT was never implemented, Disney remained almost the sole landowner in the district allowing it to maintain control of the RCID and the cities of Bay Lake and Lake Buena Vista; Disney further cemented this control by deannexing Celebration from the RCID.

The original plans for the park showed indecision over the park's purpose. Some Imagineers wanted it to represent the cutting edge of emerging technologies, while others wanted it to showcase international cultures and customs. At one point, a model of the futuristic park was pushed together against a model of a World's Fair international theme, and the two were combined. The park was originally named EPCOT Center to reflect the ideals and values of the city. It was constructed for an estimated $800 million to $1.4 billion and took three years to build, at the time the largest construction project on Earth. Before it opened on October 1, 1982, Walt Disney World Ambassador Genie Field introduced E. Cardon Walker, Disney's chairman and CEO, who dedicated EPCOT Center. Walker also presented a family with lifetime passes for the two Walt Disney World theme parks. His remarks were followed by Florida Governor Bob Graham and William Ellinghaus, president of AT&T.

1980s: Opening and operation 
As part of the opening-day ceremony, dancers and band members performed "We've Just Begun to Dream". The Sherman Brothers wrote a song especially for the occasion entitled "The World Showcase March". During the finale, doves and many sets of balloons were released. Performing groups representing countries from all over the world performed in World Showcase. Water was gathered from major rivers across the globe and emptied into the park's Fountain of Nations with ceremonial containers to mark the opening.

Dedication
The theme park opened on October 1, 1982. Located at the front of the park is a plaque bearing Walker's opening-day dedication:

1990s–2000s: Change in vision

Despite its initial success, Epcot was constantly faced with the challenges of evolving with worldwide progress, an issue that caused the park to lose relevance and become outdated in the 1990s. To maintain attendance levels, Disney introduced seasonal events such as the International Flower & Garden Festival and the International Food & Wine Festival in 1994 and 1995, respectively. In the mid-1990s, Disney also began to gradually phase out the park's edutainment attractions in favor of more modern and thrilling attractions. As a result, many of the attractions within the Future World pavilions, were either overhauled or replaced entirely; Universe of Energy was reconfigured as Ellen's Energy Adventure in 1996, World of Motion was replaced with Test Track, and Horizons was demolished in 1999 and replaced with Mission: Space. Walt Disney World held the Millennium Celebration with the central focus of the event at Epcot. The Living Seas was closed in 2005, and rethemed with the introduction of characters from Finding Nemo, as The Seas with Nemo & Friends, which is the attraction are became part of The Seas Pavilion. That same year, Soarin', a flight simulator ride originally developed for Disney's California Adventure (DCA) theme park in Anaheim, was added to The Land following its massive popularity at DCA. Wonders of Life closed in 2007, with the pavilion being occasionally used for the park's annual festivals until permanent closure.

2010–present: Transformation and redesign 
In November 2016, Disney revealed that Epcot would be receiving “a major transformation” that would help transition the park into being “more Disney, timeless, relevant, family-friendly”, while keeping the original vision alive. No further details were mentioned. In July 2017, The Walt Disney Company formally announced that Epcot would undergo a multi-year, redesign and expansion plan that would introduce Guardians of the Galaxy and Ratatouille attractions to Future World and World Showcase, respectively, as well as maintaining the original vision and spirit for the park. As part of the announcement, Ellen's Energy Adventure closed the following month, and the pavilion's show building was reused for Guardians of the Galaxy: Cosmic Rewind. That same year, the park reported the first drop in overall attendance ranking among the four Walt Disney World Resort parks, dropping from second to third place, the first in its history.

On August 25, 2019, at the 2019 D23 Expo, Disney expanded on the plans for the improvements to Epcot. One of the most significant changes announced was the creation of four distinct "neighborhoods", with the subdivision of Future World into three areas (World Celebration, World Discovery, and World Nature) and World Showcase remaining as the fourth one. Journey of Water - Inspired by Moana, a walkthrough attraction, was also announced.  The Walt Disney Company began to stylize the name as "EPCOT" as an homage to both the park's original name and Walt Disney's original concept, although the name is no longer an acronym. In late 2019, EPCOT announced that a new directory signage was installed in Seabase Alpha, restoring the former Living Seas logo, as the pavilions are now renamed The Seas Pavilion. 

The park was closed from March 16 to July 15, 2020, due to the COVID-19 pandemic in Florida. Modified operations, including a pause on concerts and fireworks followed, in order to promote sufficient physical distancing.

On September 29, 2021, the new nighttime spectacular, Harmonious, made its debut as part of the "World's Most Magical Celebration". The show is slated to close on March 31, 2023 in preparation for a new nighttime spectacular celebrating the 100th anniversary of The Walt Disney Company.  

Remy's Ratatouille Adventure opened in the France pavilion on October 1, 2021 as part of the 50th celebrations. The attraction is a copy of the Disneyland Paris version. Guardians of the Galaxy: Cosmic Rewind, part of the Wonders of Xandar Pavilion, would open on May 27, 2022 in the World Discovery section of the park. The opening of this attraction was also an addition for the 50th anniversary.

Park layout and attractions 

Epcot is divided into four main themed areas, known as "neighborhoods": World Celebration, World Discovery, World Nature and World Showcase. A secondary park gate is located between the France and United Kingdom pavilions of World Showcase and is known as the International Gateway. The International Gateway is directly accessible to guests arriving from the Disney Skyliner, watercraft transport, and by walkways from the nearby Epcot Area Resorts and Disney's Hollywood Studios.

World Celebration, Discovery, and Nature consist of a variety of avant-garde pavilions that explore innovative aspects and applications including technology and science, with each pavilion featuring self-contained attractions and distinct architecture in its design. They were originally grouped as one area called Future World, which debuted with six pavilions: Spaceship Earth, CommuniCore, Imagination!, The Land, Universe of Energy, and World of Motion. The Horizons pavilion opened the following year, and The Living Seas and Wonders of Life pavilions were added in 1986 and 1989, respectively, bringing the lineup to nine. CommuniCore, World of Motion, Horizons, Wonders of Life, Universe of Energy, and Innoventions closed in 1994, 1996, 1999, 2007, 2017, and 2019, respectively. The Fountain of Nations, a large circular musical fountain which debuted with the park, was removed in 2019 as well. Each pavilion was initially sponsored by a corporation which helped fund its construction and maintenance in return for the corporation's logos and some marketing elements appearing throughout the pavilion.

Additionally, each pavilion of Future World featured a unique circular logo designed by Norm Inouye, which was featured on park signage and throughout the attractions themselves. The pavilion logos were gradually phased out in the early 2000s, as the pavilions instead were identified by name and recognized by the main attraction(s) housed inside. Several homages remained scattered throughout the park, including merchandising. However, in 2019, Disney revealed that the concept of the circular pavilion logos would be revived as part of Epcot's transformation, with both classic logos revived and new logos introduced.

World Celebration 
World Celebration serves as the park's main entrance and as the home of "new experiences that connect us to one another and the world around us". The neighborhood honors global human interaction and connection, including communication, imagination, and the visual and culinary arts.

 Spaceship Earth, an eighteen-story-tall geodesic sphere structure and the anchor pavilion, which also houses an eponymous dark ride attraction that depicts the history of communication.
 Project Tomorrow: Inventing the Wonders of the Future is an interactive post show following Spaceship Earth showcasing many "virtual reality" games.
 Imagination!, a pavilion containing attractions that highlights human imagination, creativity, and the arts.
 Journey into Imagination with Figment, a dark ride featuring Figment that explores the senses and imagination.
 ImageWorks: The What-If Labs, an interactive post show following Journey into Imagination.
 Disney & Pixar Short Film Festival, a 3-D show composed of three animated shorts from both Walt Disney and Pixar animation studios.
Club Cool, an attraction and gift shop, featuring complimentary samples of Coca-Cola soft drinks from around the world.
Creations Shop, the park's main gift shop.
Connections Eatery & Cafe, a quick service restaurant featuring the park's Starbucks. 
 The Odyssey Events Pavilion
Future additions will include Dreamer's Point, which will include a new statue of Walt Disney, and CommuniCore Hall which will act as a multi-use festival pavilion which will be used for exhibitions, gallery space, live music, demonstration kitchen and more. CommuniCore Plaza will be able to host large-scale concerts as well as smaller musical performances.

World Discovery
World Discovery centers on "stories about space, science, technology and intergalactic adventure comes to life". Future attractions will include the Play! Pavilion.

 The Wonders of Xandar, an "other-world" showcase pavilion containing Guardians of the Galaxy: Cosmic Rewind, an enclosed roller coaster featuring the Marvel Comics superhero team.
 Mission: Space, centered on space exploration, is a centrifugal motion simulator thrill ride that replicates a space flight experience to Mars and a low orbit tour over the surface of Earth.
 Space 220, a themed restaurant simulating dining aboard a space station located 220 miles above Earth.
 Test Track, a thrill ride inspired by the rigorous automobile testing procedures that Chevrolet uses to evaluate concept cars.

World Nature
World Nature focuses on "understanding and preserving the beauty, awe and balance of the natural world". Journey of Water will be a future attraction depicting the Earth's water cycle, inspired by the 2016 animated feature film Moana.

 The Land depicts human interaction with the Earth, focusing on agriculture, ecology, and travel. The pavilion contains three attractions:
 Soarin' Around the World, an attraction that simulates a hang gliding flight over various regions of the world.
 Living with the Land, a narrated boat tour through Audio-Animatronics scenes, a greenhouse and hydroponics lab.
 Awesome Planet, a short documentary film presented in the pavilion's Harvest Theater about the Earth's biomes and the perils of climate change.
 The Seas is based on ocean exploration and features an aquarium with marine life exhibits, an Omnimover attraction inspired by Finding Nemo, Turtle Talk with Crush, and the Coral Reef Restaurant.

World Showcase
World Showcase is the park's largest neighborhood, reminiscent of a permanent world's fair dedicated to represent the culture, cuisine, architecture, and traditions of 11 nations. In counter-clockwise order, the 11 pavilions are:

  Canada
  United Kingdom
  France
  Morocco
  Japan
  United States 
  Italy
  Germany
  China
  Norway
  Mexico

There is a small pavilion between China and Germany called the African Outpost, not included as one of the official World Showcase pavilions.

Of the 11 pavilions, only Morocco and Norway were not present at the park's opening, as they were added in 1984 and 1988, respectively. Each pavilion contains themed architecture, landscapes, streetscapes, attractions, shops and restaurants representing the respective country's culture and cuisine. In an effort to maintain the authenticity of the represented countries, the pavilions are primarily staffed by citizens of the respective countries as part of the Cultural Representative Program through Q1 visa agreements. Some pavilions also contain themed rides, shows, and live entertainment representative of the respective country. The Morocco pavilion was directly sponsored by the Moroccan government until 2020, when Disney took ownership of the pavillion. The remaining pavilions are primarily sponsored by private companies with affiliations to the represented countries.

Originally, the showcase was to include partnerships with the governments of the different countries. According to Disney's 1975 Annual Report, the Showcase would:

Proposed pavilions and unused locations
Pavilions for Brazil, the Philippines, Puerto Rico, Russia, Denmark, Switzerland, Costa Rica, Spain, Venezuela, the United Arab Emirates, and Israel have occasionally been rumored as potential future pavilions but have never made it past the planning phases to date. However, Disney did go as far as announcing three of the pavilions in the 1980s with signage throughout the park.

The Israeli, Spanish, and an Equatorial Africa pavilion (blending elements of the cultures of countries such as Kenya and Zaire) were even announced as coming soon in 1982, and a model of the last was shown on the opening day telecast, but never took off. Instead, a small African themed refreshment shop known as the Outpost currently resides where Equatorial Africa was to be. More than 50 nations, among them Israel, Brazil, Chile, India, Indonesia, New Zealand, Saudi Arabia, Sweden and 5 African countries (Eritrea, Ethiopia, Kenya, Namibia, and South Africa), took part in the Millennium Village, a project that took place in Epcot during Millennium Celebration (1999-2001) to pay homage to the cultural achievements of these nations.

There are currently eight undeveloped spots for countries around the World Showcase—including the space occupied by the Outpost—in between the locations of the current countries. Two of the potential locations, on either side of the United Kingdom, are currently occupied by World ShowPlace (successor of Millennium Village). Two more lie on either side of the American Adventure, though this pavilion's use of reversed forced perspective may preclude the construction of additional buildings as they would ruin the illusion.

Alcohol policy
Unlike Magic Kingdom, which up until 2012 did not serve alcohol and now only serves it in all table service locations, most stores and restaurants at Epcot, especially in the World Showcase, serve and sell a variety of alcoholic beverages including specialty drinks, craft beers, wines, and spirits reflective of the respective countries. The park also hosts the Epcot International Food & Wine Festival, an annual event featuring food and drink samplings from all over the world, along with live entertainment and special exhibits.

The World Showcase Adventure
Originally based on the Disney Channel animated series Kim Possible, the World Showcase Adventure is an interactive mobile attraction taking place in several pavilions throughout the World Showcase. The attraction is an electronic scavenger hunt that has guests using special "Kimmunicators" (in actuality, customized cell phones) to help teenage crime-fighters Kim Possible and Ron Stoppable solve a "crime" or disrupt an evil-doer's "plans for global domination." The "Kimmunicator" is able to trigger specific events within the pavilion grounds that provide clues to completing the adventure. Launched in January 2009 and presented by Verizon Wireless, the Adventure is included in park admission. It was succeeded by Agent P's World Showcase Adventure, based on Disney's Phineas and Ferb, on June 23, 2012. Agent P's World Showcase Adventure was later closed on February 17, 2020, and was replaced by the DuckTales World Showcase Adventure, based on the 2017 reboot of DuckTales on December 16, 2022, as part of Walt Disney World's 50th Anniversary celebration.

Annual events

Epcot hosts a number of special events during the year:
The Epcot International Flower & Garden Festival, inaugurated in 1994, uses specially-themed floral displays throughout the park, including topiary sculptures of Disney characters. Guests can meet gardening experts and learn new ideas they can use in their own home gardens. As part of the 'Disney 100 Years Of Wonder' celebrations in 2023, the upcoming 19th annual event is scheduled for March 1, with an extended run of two months, leading up to July 5. Each event takes more than a full year to plan and more than 20,000 cast member hours. 
The Epcot International Food & Wine Festival, inaugurated in 1995, draws amateur and professional gourmets to sample delicacies from all around the world, including nations that do not have a permanent presence in World Showcase. Celebrity chefs are often on-hand to host the events. In 2008, the festival featured the Bocuse d'Or USA, the American semifinal of the biennial Bocuse d'Or cooking competition. The 2023 event will be held between July 14 and November 19. Sponsorship: Corkcicle.
 The Epcot International Festival of the Arts, inaugurated in 2017, is a festival showcasing visual, culinary, and performing arts. The first annual event took place on weekends from January 13 through February 20, 2017. The 4th annual Epcot International Festival of the Arts began on January 13, 2023, and ran until February 20, 2023. Sponsorship: AT&T
The Epcot International Festival of the Holidays is Epcot's annual holiday celebration. The World Showcase pavilions feature storytellers describing their nation's holiday traditions, and three nightly performances of the "Candlelight Processional" featuring an auditioned mass choir and a celebrity guest narrating the story of Christmas. Sponsorship: AdventHealth
On New Year's Eve, the park offers a variety of additional entertainment including live DJ dance areas throughout the park.

Attendance

The Official Album of Walt Disney World EPCOT Center
The Official Album of Walt Disney World EPCOT Center was the official album for EPCOT Center in 1983. It was originally released by Disneyland Vista Records on LP and audio cassette and is no longer being produced.

Track listing
Side 1
"Main Entrance Medley (Instrumental)" – 3:29
"Golden Dream" – The American Adventure in the World Showcase – 3:27
"Energy (You Make the World Go 'Round)" – Universe of Energy – 1:48
"The Computer Song" – Epcot Computer Central – 2:32
"Magic Journeys" – Journey Into Imagination – 3:36
"Canada (You're A Lifetime Journey)" – Canada in the World Showcase – 3:22

Side 2
"Universe of Energy" – Universe of Energy – 2:14
"Listen to the Land" – The Land – 2:59
"One Little Spark" – Journey Into Imagination – 3:40
"It's Fun to Be Free" – World of Motion – 2:14
"Makin' Memories" – Journey Into Imagination – 3:26
"Kitchen Kabaret Medley" – The Land – 2:20
Boogie Woogie Bakery Boy
Meat Ditties
Veggie Veggie Fruit Fruit

See also 
List of Epcot attractions
Epcot Resort Area
WestCOT

References

Further reading
Alcorn, Steve and David Green. Building a Better Mouse: The Story of the Electronic Imagineers Who Designed Epcot. Themeperks Press, 2007, .
Mannheim, Steve (2002).  Walt Disney and the Quest for Community.  Routledge.  .

External links
 

 
1982 establishments in Florida
Amusement parks opened in 1982
Tourist attractions in Greater Orlando
Walt Disney World
Architecture related to utopias